The women's C-1 200 metres canoeing event at the 2015 Pan American Games will be held on July 14 at the Welland Pan Am Flatwater Centre in Welland.

Schedule
The following is the competition schedule for the event:

All times are Eastern Daylight Time (UTC−4)

Results

Final

References

Canoeing at the 2015 Pan American Games